Tombuiyeh (also Romanized as Tombū’īyeh; also known as Tomū, Tomū’īyeh, and Yakh Mūr) is a village in Bezenjan Rural District, in the Central District of Baft County, Kerman Province, Iran. At the 2006 census, its population was 87, in 26 families.

References 

Populated places in Baft County